George Webbe may refer to:

George Webbe (MP) (by 1509 – 1556)
George Webbe (cricketer) (1856–1934)

See also
George Webb (disambiguation)